This is a list of all the United States Supreme Court cases from volume 499 of the United States Reports:

External links